Gabriela Aguileta Estrada (born 1974) is a Mexican writer of children's books and short stories. Born in Mexico City, she studied biology at the Faculty of Sciences of the UNAM in Mexico and in 2004 earned a doctorate in genetics from University College London (UK). As scientist and writer she has studied, worked and lived in Israel, Canada, England, Sweden, France, Spain and Switzerland. She was on the editorial board of the children's literary magazine La sonrisa del gato and in 2004 she was awarded a writer's fellowship from the National Foundation for Mexican Literature (Fundación para las Letras Mexicanas). She has also authored three popular science books which allowed her to promote interest in science among children and young adults. Most of her work has been published in Spanish.

Published works

Books 
 El Espejo En El Agua (2000) by E. Gabriela Aguileta Estrada (Author) and Guillermo De Gante (Illustrator), 122pp, Ediciones Castillo (Castillo de La Lectura Naranja). , 
 La Conspiracion de Las Tias (2001) by Gabriela Aguileta Estrada (Author) and Campos F. Angel (Illustrator), 133pp, Ediciones Castillo (Castillo de La Lectura Naranja). , . 
 Diarios Inconclusos I: El Oscuro Jardin de los Pelagos: 1 (2006) by Gabriela Aguileta, 96pp, Ediciones Castillo (Castillo del Terror). , .
 La sombra del brujo (2006) by Gabriela Aguileta, 91pp, Editorial Progreso. , .
 El domador de agua (2009) by Gabriela Aguileta, 120pp, Editorial Progreso. .

Popular Science Books for children 
 Miguel Ángel & Gabriela Aguileta. (2006). "Las células madre", 24pp. Libros del escarabajo, México, D.F. . 
 Gabriela Aguileta (2005). "El origen de la vida", 24pp. Libros del escarabajo, México, D.F. 
 Gabriela Aguileta (2005). "Los virus", 24pp. Libros del escarabajo, México, D.F.

Short stories
 Gabriela Aguileta Estrada (2009) "Sobre coprolitos y otras cosas menos embarazosas" in Los derechos de los niños no son cuento, 136pp, Montena. .
 Gabriela Aguileta Estrada (2009) "Oquedades de la caja negra" in Boleto al infierno. Viaje sencillo, 210pp, Santillana. .
 Gabriela Aguileta Estrada (2009) "Tres kilos para Plácido" in Siete cuentos muy cochinos, 164pp, Santillana. .  
 Gabriela Aguileta Estrada (2008) "Fábula del pez y el desierto" in Siete Habitaciones an Oscuras, 144pp, Grupo Editorial Norma (Torre De Papel: Amarilla). , .  
 Gabriela Aguileta (2010) "El cha cha chá de la letra zeta" in Torre De Papel: edición aniversario 20 años, 263pp, Grupo Editorial Norma (Torre De Papel: Rojo). .
 Gabriela Aguileta (2014) "Topo" in Otras siete habitaciones a oscuras, 192pp, Grupo Editorial Norma (Torre de Papel: Amarilla). .

Literary Essays 
Gabriela Aguileta (2007). "Los trópicos de Sir Galahad". Metapolítica: la mirada limpia de la política, Vol. 11, Nº. 56, págs. 91-92, ISSN-e 1405-4558
 Gabriela Aguileta (2008). "La desmesura de lo inhabitable". Metapolítica: la mirada limpia de la política, Vol. 12, Nº. 58, ISSN-e 1405-4558 (Ejemplar dedicado a: Heréticos y disidentes)
 Gabriela Aguileta (2008). "Cualquier lugar menos aquí". Metapolítica: la mirada limpia de la política, Nº. 61, ISSN-e 1405-4558 (Ejemplar dedicado a: Napoleón y la Independencia)
 Gabriela Aguileta (2009). "El espejo de la medusa: conócete a ti mismo, conoce tu genoma". Metapolítica: la mirada limpia de la política, Nº. 63, ISSN-e 1405-4558 (Ejemplar dedicado a: México: la sociedad indefensa)
 Gabriela Aguileta (2012). "Naturaleza (y) madre". Casa del Tiempo Vol. V época IV, número 55, p. 24-45, May 2012, ISSN 0185-4275.
 Gabriela Aguileta (2012). "La nuez". Casa del Tiempo Vol. V época IV, número 57-58, p. 16-17, Jul-Aug 2012, ISSN 0185-4275.
 Gabriela Aguileta (2016). "Sinuosidades del Lemán". Casa del Tiempo Vol. III época V, número 30-31, p. 18-21, Jul-Aug 2016, ISSN 2448-5446.

Prizes 
She has received the following prizes:
 Premio Castillo de la Lectura 2001 for "La conspiración de las tías".
 Premio Castillo de la Lectura 2000 for "El espejo en el agua".

References

External links

Official Page

Mexican children's writers
Mexican women children's writers
Mexican essayists
Writers from Mexico City
National Autonomous University of Mexico alumni
Alumni of University College London
1974 births
Living people
20th-century Mexican writers
21st-century Mexican writers
21st-century Mexican women writers
20th-century Mexican women writers